The 1974 Israel Super Cup was the fourth Israel Super Cup (ninth, including unofficial matches, as the competition wasn't played within the Israel Football Association in its first 5 editions, until 1969), an annual Israel football match played between the winners of the previous season's Top Division and Israel State Cup. With this match, the competitions resumed after two years of absence.

The match was played between Maccabi Netanya, champions of the 1973–74 Liga Leumit and Hapoel Haifa, winners of the 1973–74 Israel State Cup.

For both teams, this was their second appearance in the competition. At the match, played at Kiryat Haim Stadium, Maccabi Netanya won 2–1.

Match details

References

1974
Super Cup
Super Cup 1974
Super Cup 1974
Israel Super Cup matches